Début de Soirée (literally Beginning of the Party) was a French pop music duo which had a huge success in 1988 with their song "Nuit de folie", a number-one single in France.

History
Released for the first time in 1984 while the 2 singers were DJ in nightclubs in the south of France, the song "Nuit de folie" didn't meet success.  They had difficulties in finding a record company to re-release a new version in 1988. However, the song was a great success : "Nuit de folie" was even the best-selling single of 1988 in France. It is currently still regarded as a classic dance music song.

The band split in 2004.

Members
 William Picard (singer, songwriter)
 Sacha Goëller (singer)

Discography

Singles
With peak positions and certifications in France :
 "Nuit de folie" (1988) - #1 (x 9) in France, Platinum
 "La Vie la nuit" (1989) - #2 in France, Gold
 "Jardins d'enfants" (1989) - #5 in France, Silver
 "Chance" (1989) - #30 in France
 "Belles Belles Belles" (1990) - #49 in France
 "De Révolution en Satisfaction" (1991)
 "Nuit de folie" (Remix) (1999) - #72 in France

Albums
 Jardins d'enfants (1989) - Gold
 Tous les paradis (1991)
 Faut pas exagérer (1996)
 Best of (1996)

References

External links
 Official website

French musical duos